The house at 809 Grand View Avenue is a Mission/Spanish Revival style house located in Kingman, Arizona. It is listed on the National Register of Historic Places.  It was evaluated for National Register listing as part of a 1985 study of 63 historic resources in Kingman that led to this and many others being listed.

Description 
The house on 809 Grand View Avenue in Kingman, Arizona was built around 1923 in the Mission/Spanish Revival style. John Osterman was the architect. He was a local contractor. The house is built in the new Metcalfe Addition of downtown Kingman, an early suburban area of Kingman. This represents the shift in home building in a new area of Kingman and expansion of the town. 809 Grand view is one of three homes at the time of Mission/Spanish Revival. The home has a square corner tower and recessed central entry. The house was added to the National Register of Historic Places in 1986.

References

Houses completed in 1923
Houses in Kingman, Arizona
Houses on the National Register of Historic Places in Arizona
National Register of Historic Places in Kingman, Arizona